Norwood is a historic plantation house and farm located near Berryville, Clarke County, Virginia. The main house was built about 1819, and consists of a two-story, three bay, brick main block with two-story, brick side wing in the Federal-style. The front facade features a classical one-story, one-bay portico with Doric order columns.  Also on the property are the contributing brick meathouse, which dates to the same period as the main house; a late 19th-century frame tenant house; and several late 19th-century agricultural buildings.

It was listed on the National Register of Historic Places in 1994.

References

Plantation houses in Virginia
Houses on the National Register of Historic Places in Virginia
Farms on the National Register of Historic Places in Virginia
National Register of Historic Places in Clarke County, Virginia
Federal architecture in Virginia
Houses completed in 1819
Houses in Clarke County, Virginia